Utricularia densiflora is a carnivorous plant in the genus Utricularia and is endemic to Brazil. The species epithet densiflora refers to the density of flowers that each plant produces, which typically ranges from 15 to 23 flowers congested near the top of the inflorescence. Beneath the lowermost opened flower, there are several rudimentary or dormant flower buds that make it unique in the genus, along with other diagnostic characteristics. It is most similar morphologically to U. erectiflora and U. meyeri.

Utricularia densiflora is only known from one location near the Serra da Baleia in the Chapada dos Veadeiros National Park in Goiás state, Brazil.

See also 
 List of Utricularia species

References 

Carnivorous plants of South America
Flora of Brazil
Plants described in 2011
densiflora